The 1999 Torridge District Council election took place on 6 May 1999 to elect members of Torridge District Council in Devon, England. The whole council was up for election and independents gained overall control of the council from no overall control.

Election result
Overall turnout at the election was 36.1%.

Ward results

By-elections between 1999 and 2003

Westward Ho!

Holsworthy

References

1999
1999 English local elections
1990s in Devon